Barry's Amusements was an amusement park in Portrush in Northern Ireland. Located in the center of Portrush, County Antrim, on the north coast, it was founded in 1925. The owners offered it for sale in 2019 and it was reported sold for redevelopment in 2021. In April 2022, it reopened under lease as Curry's Fun Park.

Park
The amusement park occupies  in the center of Portrush;  it was the largest amusement park in Ireland. It has a mixture of traditional and modern amusements and was normally open from Easter Monday until the first week in September. Barry's employed many teenagers and university students from the area.

History
It became the longest-running amusement park in Northern Ireland. The couple toured with the circus and then opened the amusement park in 1926 after being invited by the local railway company to permanently locate on a site beside the railway station; according to the company history, rather than use either of their family names, they named it 'Barry's' after the first supplier to arrive on-site, Barr. The family at one time also operated Barry's amusement parks in Belfast and  Bangor.

The park was offered for sale in November 2019 as a going concern, but was unable to open for the 2020 season because of the COVID-19 pandemic. In May 2021 it was offered for sale as a development opportunity. An online petition was launched protesting against development. In early August, Barry's was reported sold to property developer Michael Herbert. In September 2021, the new owner sought a tenant to operate it as an entertainment or leisure venue; in March 2022 the Curry family, who operate Curry's Fun Park in Salthill, in County Galway, announced that they had signed a long-term lease and planned to reopen Barry's at Easter, also as Curry's Fun Park. It reopened on 9 April 2022.

Attractions

Attractions

Former attractions

In Popular Culture
Barry's Amusements, specifically The Big Dipper and Ghost Train, were featured in season 3, episode 4 of Derry Girls.

See also
List of theme parks in the United Kingdom

References

Further information

External links

 Official website (archived on 6 March 2019)

1925 establishments in Northern Ireland
Tourist attractions in County Antrim
Amusement parks in the United Kingdom
Portrush